Berthe Burgkan (1855–1936) was a French painter. She was known for her genre and flower paintings.

Biography
Burgkan was born in Paris in 1855. She attended the École des Beaux-Arts where she studied with Gustave Boulanger and at the Académie Julian where she studied with Jules Joseph Lefebvre and Tony Robert-Fleury.

She exhibited her paintings at the Paris Salon from 1878 through 1920. She also exhibited at the Arts de la Femme. In 1883 Burgkan became a member of the Société des Artistes Français. She exhibited her work at the Palace of Fine Arts at the 1893 World's Columbian Exposition in Chicago, Illinois.

She died in 1936.

References

External links
images of Berthe Burgkan's paintings on artNET

1855 births
1936 deaths
19th-century French women artists
19th-century French painters
Painters from Paris
Académie Julian alumni